Harold Parks may refer to:

George Edwards (actor), born Harold Parks
Harold R. Parks, mathematician